Croton alabamensis, known as Alabama croton, is a plant native to North America, including Alabama in the Southeastern United States.

Description
The species is a semi-evergreen shrub that grows in loose, multi-stemmed thickets. It is a popular ornamental.

Distribution
Croton alabamensis var. alabamensis is only found in four central Alabama counties and one county in Tennessee.  Croton alabamensis var. texensis, called  Texabama croton, is found in three counties in Texas.

References

alabamensis
Flora of Tennessee
Flora of Alabama
Flora of Texas
Plants described in 1883
Taxa named by Alvan Wentworth Chapman